Separatist kebabists is a term used by Devlet Bahçeli in one of his speeches to describe kebab sellers and other vendors who allegedly "support terrorism" by charging high prices for their products. The speech was made fun of by social media users.

Speech 
Bahçeli criticised the rising prices and unemployment in Turkey and attributed the responsibility to vendors in his speech.

Reactions 
Ahmet Davutoğlu, chairman of the Future Party, punned on the speech saying that "simit and car vendors are anxious brooding on who is to be the next target [of Bahçeli]." Cengiz Gökçel, a MP from CHP, criticised the speech saying that "the real terrorists are the ones who cause the purchasing power [of the currency] reduce and the unemployment increase." The speech also caused widespread reaction on Twitter.

References 

Nationalist Movement Party
Street food in Turkey
Political controversies in Turkey
2021 in Turkey